María Isabel Pansa (born 1961) is an Argentine military officer. She is the first woman to attain the rank of general de brigada (brigade general) in the Argentine Army.

Biography
María Isabel Pansa joined the Argentine Army in 1982, while the country was in the midst of the Falklands War. She holds a licentiate in information technology from the University of Belgrano.

In 2007 she was appointed by President Néstor Kirchner to serve as aide-de-camp to incoming President Cristina Fernández de Kirchner as of 10 December of that year, when she had the rank of lieutenant colonel. Along with the corvette captain Claudia Fenocchio and the vice-commodore Silvana Carrascosa, she is one of the first three women in Argentine history to occupy that role.

On 30 December 2008 she was promoted to the rank of colonel by Presidential Decree 2297/2008. In 2012 she received a licentiate in psychology from the Merchant Marine University.

On 30 July 2015, President Cristina Fernández de Kirchner proposed her promotion to the rank of brigade general. The Senate unanimously approved the proposal on 7 October 2015. On 14 October 2015, Pansa was formally promoted to the rank of brigade general by Decree 2161/2015, retroactively effective as of 31 December 2014.

Replacement
On 5 February 2016, María Isabel Pansa was replaced as presidential military aide-de-camp by decree, effective 9 December 2015. The position passed to Lieutenant Colonel Santiago Ignacio Ibáñez.

Notes

References

1961 births
Argentine brigadiers
Argentine psychologists
Argentine women psychologists
Female army generals
Living people